In mathematical physics, higher-dimensional gamma matrices generalize to arbitrary dimension the four-dimensional Gamma matrices of Dirac, which are a mainstay of relativistic quantum mechanics.  They are utilized in relativistically invariant wave equations for fermions (such as spinors)  in arbitrary space-time dimensions, notably in string theory and supergravity. The Weyl–Brauer matrices provide an explicit construction of higher-dimensional gamma matrices for Weyl spinors. Gamma matrices also appear in generic settings in Riemannian geometry, particularly when a spin structure can be defined.

Introduction 
Consider a space-time of dimension  with the flat Minkowski metric,  
 
Set .

In higher (and lower) dimensions, one may define a group, the gamma group, behaving in the same fashion as the Dirac matrices.

By convention, the gamma group is realized as a collection of matrices, the gamma matrices, although the group definition does not require this. In particular, many important properties, including the C, P and T symmetries do not require a specific matrix representation, and one obtains a clearer definition of chirality in this way. Several matrix representations are possible, some given below, and others in the article on the Weyl–Brauer matrices.  In the matrix representation, the spinors are -dimensional, with the gamma matrices acting on the spinors. A detailed construction of spinors is given in the article on Clifford algebra. Jost provides a standard reference for spinors in the general setting of Riemmannian geometry.

Gamma group 
Most of the properties of the gamma matrices can be captured by a group, the gamma group. This group can be defined without reference to the real numbers, the complex numbers, or even any direct appeal to the Clifford algebra. The matrix representations of this group then provide a concrete realization that can be used to specify the action of the gamma matrices on spinors. For  dimensions, the matrix products behave just as the conventional Dirac matrices. The Pauli group is a representation of the gamma group for  although the Pauli group has more relationships (is less free); see the note about the chiral element below for an example. The quaternions provide a representation for 

The presentation of the gamma group  is as follows.

 The remaining generators  obey  

These generators completely define the gamma group. It can be shown that, for all  that  and so  Every element  can be uniquely written as a product of a finite number of generators placed in canonical order as

with the indexes in ascending order

and   The gamma group is finite, and has at most  elements in it.  

The gamma group is a 2-group but not a regular p-group. The commutator subgroup (derived subgroup) is  therefore it is not a powerful p-group. In general, 2-groups have a large number of involutions; the gamma group does likewise. Three particular ones are singled out below, as they have a specific interpretation in the context of Clifford algebras, in the context of the representations of the gamma group (where transposition and Hermitian conjugation literally correspond to those actions on matrices), and in physics, where the "main involution"  corresponds to a combined P-symmetry and T-symmetry.

Transposition
Given elements  of the generating set of the gamma group, the transposition or reversal is given by

If there are  elements  all distinct, then

Hermitian conjugation
Another automorphism of the gamma group is given by conjugation, defined on the generators as

If one interprets the  dimensions as being "time-like", and the  dimensions as being "space-like", then this corresponds to P-symmetry in physics. That this is the "correct" identification follows from the conventional Dirac matrices, where  is associated with the time-like direction, and the  the spatial directions, with the "conventional" (+−−−) metric.  Other metric and representational choices suggest other interpretations.

Main involution
The main involution is the map that "flips" the generators:  but leaves  alone:  This map corresponds to the combined P-symmetry and T-symmetry in physics; all directions are reversed.

Chiral element
Define the chiral element  as

where . The chiral element commutes with the generators as

It squares to

For the Dirac matrices, the chiral element corresponds to  thus its name, as it plays an important role in distinguishing the chirality of spinors.

For the Pauli group, the chiral element is  whereas for the gamma group , one cannot deduce any such relationship for  other than that it squares to  This is an example of where a representation may have more identities the represented group.  For the quaternions, which provide a representation of  the chiral element is

Charge conjugation
None of the above automorphisms (transpose, conjugation, main involution) are inner automorphisms; that is they cannot be represented in the form  for some existing element  in the gamma group, as presented above.  Charge conjugation requires extending the gamma group with two new elements; by convention, these are

and

The above relations are not sufficient to define a group;  and other products are undetermined.

Matrix representation

 
where the matrix  is the identity matrix in   dimensions. Transposition and Hermitian conjugation correspond to their usual meaning on matrices.

Charge conjugation 
For the remainder of this article,it is assumed that  and so .  That is, the Clifford algebra  is assumed. In this case, the gamma matrices have the following property under Hermitian conjugation,
 

Transposition will be denoted with a minor change of notation, by mapping  where the element on the left is the abstract group element, and the one on the right is the literal matrix transpose.

As before, the generators  all generate the same group (the generated groups are all isomorphic; the operations are still involutions). In general, such a matrix can be found. By convention, there are two of interest; in the physics literature, both referred to as charge conjugation matrices. Explicitly, these are

 

They can be constructed as real matrices in various dimensions, as the following table shows.  In even dimension both  exist, in odd dimension just one.

Note that  is a basis choice.

Symmetry properties 
We denote a product of gamma matrices by

and note that the anti-commutation property allows us to simplify any such sequence to one in which the indices are distinct and increasing.  Since distinct  anti-commute this motivates the introduction of an anti-symmetric "average".  We introduce the anti-symmetrised products of distinct -tuples from 0, ...,  − 1:

There are 2d such products, but only 2 are independent, spanning the space of × matrices.

Typically,  provide the (bi)spinor representation of the   generators of the higher-dimensional Lorentz group, generalizing the 6 matrices σμν of the spin representation of the Lorentz group in four dimensions.

For even ,  one may further define the hermitian chiral matrix 
 
(In odd dimensions, such a matrix would commute with all as and would thus be proportional to the identity, so it is not considered.)

A  matrix is called symmetric if
 
otherwise, for a − sign,  it is called antisymmetric.

In  = 6, there is no such criterion and therefore we consider both.

Identities
The proof of the trace identities for gamma matrices hold for all even dimension. For other identities (the ones that involve a contraction), explicit functions of  will appear.

Even when the number of physical dimensions is four, these more general identities are ubiquitous in loop calculations due to dimensional regularization.

Example of an explicit construction in the chiral basis 
The   matrices can be constructed recursively, first in all even dimensions,  = 2, and thence in odd ones, 2 + 1.

d = 2 
Using the Pauli matrices, take
 

and one may easily check that the charge conjugation matrices are
 

One may finally define the hermitian chiral chir to be

Generic even d = 2k  

Explicitly, 
 

One may then construct the charge conjugation matrices,
 

with the following properties,
 

Starting from the sign values for  = 2, (2,+) = +1 and (2,−) = −1, one may fix all subsequent signs (d,±)  which have periodicity 8; explicitly, one finds

Again, one may define the hermitian chiral matrix in +2  dimensions as
 

which is diagonal by construction and transforms under charge conjugation as
 

It is thus evident that  = 0.

Generic odd d = 2k + 1 
Consider the previous construction for  − 1 (which is even) and simply take all  matrices, to which append its .  (The  is required in order to yield an antihermitian matrix, and extend into the spacelike metric).

Explicitly, require
 

As the dimension  ranges, patterns typically repeat themselves with period 8. (cf. the Clifford algebra clock.)

See also
 Weyl–Brauer matrices
 Bispinor
 Clifford module

Notes

References

General reading
  
 
 
 
 de Wit, Bryce and  Smith, J. (1986).  Field Theory in Particle Physics (North-Holland Personal Library), Volume 1, Paperback, Appendix E (Archived from original), 
 Murayama, H. (2007).    "Notes on Clifford Algebra and Spin(N) Representations"
 Pietro Giuseppe Frè (2012). "Gravity, a Geometrical Course: Volume 1: Development of the Theory and Basic Physical Applications." Springer-Verlag. . See pp 315ff.

Spinors
Matrices
Clifford algebras